The 2012 Red Bull MotoGP Rookies Cup season was the sixth season of the Red Bull MotoGP Rookies Cup. The season began at Circuito de Jerez on 28 April and ended on 30 September at MotorLand Aragón after 15 races. The races, contested by the riders on equal KTM 125cc machinery for the last season before switching to the 250cc 4-stroke Moto3 bikes for 2013, were held at eight meetings on the Grand Prix motorcycle racing calendar.

German rider Florian Alt won the championship, securing the title with a third place in the first Aragon race.

Calendar

Entry list

Championship standings
Points were awarded to the top fifteen finishers. Rider had to finish the race to earn points.

References

External links
 Official Site
 Season at FIM-Website

Red Bull MotoGP Rookies Cup
Red Bull MotoGP Rookies Cup racing seasons